In electronics, slew rate is defined as the change of voltage or current, or any other electrical quantity, per unit of time. Expressed in SI units, the unit of measurement is volts/second or amperes/second, but is usually expressed in terms of microseconds (μs) or nanoseconds (ns).

Electronic circuits may specify minimum or maximum limits on the slew rates for their inputs or outputs, with these limits only valid under some set of given conditions (e.g. output loading). When given for the output of a circuit, such as an amplifier, the slew rate specification guarantees that the speed of the output signal transition will be at least the given minimum, or at most the given maximum. When applied to the input of a circuit, it instead indicates that the external driving circuitry needs to meet those limits in order to guarantee the correct operation of the receiving device. If these limits are violated, some error might occur and correct operation is no longer guaranteed.

For example, when the input to a digital circuit is driven too slowly, the digital input value registered by the circuit may oscillate between 0 and 1 during the signal transition. In other cases, a maximum slew rate is specified in order to limit the high frequency content present in the signal, thereby preventing such undesirable effects as ringing or radiated EMI.

In amplifiers, limitations in slew rate capability can give rise to non-linear effects. For a sinusoidal waveform not to be subject to slew rate limitation, the slew rate capability (in volts per second) at all points in an amplifier must satisfy the following condition:

In mechanics the slew rate is given in dimensions 1/T and is associated with the change in position over time of an object which orbits around the observer.  Slew rate can also be measured in degrees per second.

Definition
The slew rate of an electronic circuit is defined as the rate of change of the voltage per unit time. Slew rate is usually expressed in units of V/μs.

 

where  is the output produced by the amplifier as a function of time t.

Measurement
The slew rate can be measured using a function generator (usually square wave) and an oscilloscope (CRO). The slew rate is the same, regardless of whether feedback is considered.

Slew rate limiting in amplifiers
There are slight differences between different amplifier designs in how the slewing phenomenon occurs.  However, the general principles are the same as in this illustration.

The input stage of modern amplifiers is usually a differential amplifier with a transconductance characteristic.  This means the input stage takes a differential input voltage and produces an output current into the second stage.

The transconductance is typically very high — this is where the large open loop gain of the amplifier is generated.  This also means that a fairly small input voltage can cause the input stage to saturate.  In saturation, the stage produces a nearly constant output current.

The second stage of modern power amplifiers is, among other things, where frequency compensation is accomplished.  The low pass characteristic of this stage approximates an integrator.  A constant current input will therefore produce a linearly increasing output.  If the second stage has an effective input capacitance  and voltage gain , then slew rate in this example can be expressed as:

 

where  is the output current of the first stage in saturation.

Slew rate helps us identify the maximum input frequency and amplitude applicable to the amplifier such that the output is not significantly distorted. Thus it becomes imperative to check the datasheet for the device's slew rate before using it for high-frequency applications.

Musical applications

In electronic musical instruments, slew circuitry or software-generated slew functions are used deliberately to provide a portamento (also called glide or lag) feature, where an initial digital value or analog control voltage is slowly transitioned to a new value over a period of time (see interpolation).

See also
 Power bandwidth

References

External links 
 Slew-rate explanation with interactive example and detailed calculation for a standard opamp circuit
 Linear Circuit Design Chapter 1: Op Amps

Electrical parameters
Electronics concepts
Temporal rates